The Techrules Ren (stylized Techrules REN) is a single-door, high-performance sports car manufactured by Techrules, and designed by Fabrizio Giugiaro and Giorgetto Giugiaro of GFG Style. At its launch, it will become the first sports car to contain a turbine engine. This is also the first production sports car from Techrules. Expectations for the vehicle's construction are 10 (hand-built) per year.

The car was successfully tested at the Circuit de Spa-Francorchamps and Autodromo Nazionale Monza race tracks with no damage and harm.

Choice of name 

The name "ren" is the first of five values that every Chinese person is born with to contribute to the society, and means humanity and kindness.

Vehicle design 

The exterior design was inspired by aerospace engineering, with the inclusion of a rear fin, and a cockpit-like cabin. The cockpit cabin will differ, depending on the number of chosen seats, from one to three. The chassis design was designed by L.M. Gianetti. The interior slightly represents the British-built sports car, the McLaren F1, with the inclusion of three seats, but this is only if the customer has chosen the option of three front seating. The interior also contains a denim material for the seats, which is constructed by high-end Italian clothing company, PT Pantaloni Torino.

The exterior, interior, and chassis designs were each designed by the team of Fabrizio and Giorgetto Giugiaro and company L.M. Gianetti.

Ren - vehicle data

Specifications 
The Ren is powered by a turbine and a lithium-ion electric motor, but there are three specification options, making the setups different. The option for a turbine-electric motor combination was, according to CEO Matthew Jin, to make the conversion process of freeing the combustion engine to convert chemical energy into mechanical energy more efficient.

There are three specification options. This makes the car rear-wheel drive only. The second setup makes the car all-wheel drive. The car can achieve 31 MPG. Electric motor lifespan stands at 100,000 cycles, which makes the battery longevity something to be less worried about.

The chassis was built in carbon-fiber material, with an aluminum bulkhead rear.

The AP Racing brakes are carbon ceramic discs, in which are coupled with six-piston calipers front and rear. The suspension uses a horizontally adjustable coil-over shock setup.

Performance 

Ren RS - vehicle data

Specifications 
The hardcore, track-only variant of the Ren, the Techrules Ren RS, was unveiled at the Geneva Motor Show alongside its road-oriented sibling. As with the most powerful powertrain of the street-legal version, the Ren RS is all-wheel drive.

Performance 

In media 

 The car was questioned of its use of the turbine engine in an interview with CEO Matthew Jin and Autocar. He explained that this was to make the conversion of freeing the combustion engine to convert chemical energy into mechanical energy be more efficient.
 The car was also featured in the 2017 Concorso d'Eleganza Villa d'Este.

References 

Sports cars
Hybrid electric cars
Ren